Bjørn Christian Ludvigsen (born 14 February 1969) is a Norwegian former footballer who played as a midfielder.

Career
Ludvigsen was born in Harstad, lived in Nesna and Andenes during his early childhood and started his youth football career in Andenes IL. At age 12 his family settled in Harstad, where he continued as a youth player in Harstad IL and eventually made his first-team debut. With Harstad, he played on Norway's second tier in 1989, but was also obliged to finish military training at the age of 20. He went on to Tromsdalen UIL in 1992.

According to a football pundit in the newspaper Tromsø, the 1993 season was the first where Ludvigsen recorded stable performances on a high level, the second tier in Norway. He was Tromsdalen's penalty shooter. Ahead of the 1994 season he moved on to the bigger club Tromsø IL.

He made his Tromsø IL debut together with Jonny Hanssen. Ludvigsen was described by manager Harald Aabrekk; "He is strong and has a very good stride. At the same time he goes along very well with Morten Kræmer on the left back. In Eliteserien, my only hope is that he doesn't become too frightful of failure".

He captained Tromsø for the first time against Mjølner in the 1995 cup. His contract expiring after the season, he was offered an extension with somewhat higher wages. After transfer interest from Moss FK did not materialize into anything, Ludvigsen signed.

Ludvigsen ultimately left Tromsø after featuring in the victorious 1996 Norwegian Football Cup Final. With the player being under contract for one more year, Tromsø was approached by Sogndal, Lyn and Harstad about a transfer. Ludvigsen's hometown club Harstad only offered a part-time contract, but also the prospect of a job within  "international export marketing". Ludvigsen returned to Harstad IL, became player-coach and later served a second stint as Harstad IL's manager.

References

1969 births
Living people
People from Andøy
People from Harstad
People from Nesna
Sportspeople from Troms og Finnmark
Norwegian footballers
Association football midfielders
Eliteserien players
Norwegian First Division players
Harstad IL players
Tromsdalen UIL players
Tromsø IL players